Norway competed at the 2016 Summer Paralympics in Rio de Janeiro, Brazil, from 7 September to 18 September 2016. They won a total of eight medals; three gold, two silver and three bronze. Sarah Louise Rung led the team by winning five medals in swimming; two gold, one silver and two bronze.

Disability classifications

Every participant at the Paralympics has their disability grouped into one of five disability categories; amputation, the condition may be congenital or sustained through injury or illness; cerebral palsy; wheelchair athletes, there is often overlap between this and other categories; visual impairment, including blindness; Les autres, any physical disability that does not fall strictly under one of the other categories, for example dwarfism or multiple sclerosis. Each Paralympic sport then has its own classifications, dependent upon the specific physical demands of competition. Events are given a code, made of numbers and letters, describing the type of event and classification of the athletes competing. Some sports, such as athletics, divide athletes by both the category and severity of their disabilities, other sports, for example swimming, group competitors from different categories together, the only separation being based on the severity of the disability.

Medallists

Archery 

|-
|align=left|Morten Johannessen
|align=left|Men's individual compound open
|648
|24
|L 136–143
|colspan=4|did not advance
|17
|}

Athletics

Boccia

Cycling

Road

Equestrian 

The country qualified to participate in the team event at the Rio Games.

Individual

Team

"#" indicates that the score of this rider does not count in the team competition, since only the best three results of a team are counted.

Rowing

One pathway for qualifying for Rio involved having a boat have top eight finish at the 2015 FISA World Rowing Championships in a medal event.  Norway qualified for the 2016 Games under this criteria in the AS Women's Single Sculls event with a third-place finish in a time of 05:31.940.

Qualification Legend: FA=Final A (medal); FB=Final B (non-medal); R=Repechage

Sailing

Norway qualified a boat for two of the three sailing classes at the Games through their results at the 2014 Disabled Sailing World Championships held in Halifax, Nova Scotia, Canada. Places were earned in the solo 2.4mR event and a crew also qualified for the three-person Sonar class.

Shooting 

The first opportunity to qualify for shooting at the Rio Games took place at the 2014 IPC Shooting World Championships in Suhl. Shooters earned spots for their NPC.  Norway earned a qualifying spot at this event in the R6 – 50m Air Pistol Mixed SH1 event as a result of the performance Ove Foss.  Norway also earned a spot in the R5 – 10m Air Rifle Prone Mixed SH2 based on Heidi Kristin Sørlie-Rogne's performance.  Norway's third spot was earned by Sonja Jennie Tobiassen in the R4 – 10m Air Rifle Standing Mixed SH2 event. Amanda Dybendal earned Norway's third spot for women and fourth overall after her performance in the R5 – 10m Air Rifle Prone Mixed SH2 event.

The last direct qualifying event for Rio in shooting took place at the 2015 IPC Shooting World Cup in Fort Benning in November. Monica Lillehagen earned a qualifying spot for their country at this competition in the R2 Women's 10m Air Rifle Standing SH1 event.

Swimming 

Men

Women

Table tennis 

Men

Women

See also
Norway at the 2016 Summer Olympics

References

Nations at the 2016 Summer Paralympics
2016
2016 in Norwegian sport